What Kind of World is the fifth album by American singer-songwriter Brendan Benson. The album's release on April 21, 2012 coincided with his son's second birthday. The album was released on Benson's own Readymade Records in the US and British indie label Lojinx in Europe. It peaked at number 7 on the UK Indie album chart in the week of release.

Track listing 
All songs written by Brendan Benson unless otherwise stated.

 "What Kind of World" - 4:07
 "Bad for Me" - 4:05
 "Light of Day" - 3:33
 "Happy Most of the Time" - 3:40
 "Keep Me" - 2:14
 "Pretty Baby" - 3:24
 "Here in the Deadlights" - 3:09
 "Met Your Match" - 2:38
 "Thru the Ceiling" - 3:03  (Benson/Jay Joyce)
 "No One Else but You" - 3:46
 "Come On" - 2:51
 "On the Fence" - 3:54  (Benson/Ashley Monroe)

Personnel
Brendan Benson - Lead Vocals, Guitar, Keyboards
Max Abrams - Alto Saxophone, Baritone Saxophone 
Sam Farrar - Bass, Guitar, Ambience  
Brad Pemberton - Drums, Percussion  
Jay Joyce - Guitar 
Jon Auer - Guitar, Bass  
Mark Watrous - Guitar, Bass, Keyboards 
Andrew Higley - Keyboards 
Bill Livsley - Keyboards 
Ken Stringfellow - Keyboards, Bass  
Pete Finney - Pedal Steel Guitar  
Mitch Reilley - Tenor Saxophone  
Jon-Paul Frappier - Trumpet  
Ashley Monroe, Luke Skidmore, Neil O'Neil, Tyler Jones, Young Hines - Vocals

Credits
Recorded and Mixed in Nashville, Tennessee at Welcome To 1979 Studios
Engineered by Greg Thompson and Joe Costa
Mastered by Tommy Wiggins
Mixed by Brendan Benson and Chris Mara
Photography by Jo McCaughey 
Artwork by They Make It In The Basement

Charts

References 
Discogs http://www.discogs.com/Brendan-Benson-What-Kind-Of-World/release/3611010

Brendan Benson albums
2012 albums
Lojinx albums